Corrado Annicelli (1 September 1905 – 28 August 1984) was an Italian actor.

Life and career
Born in Naples, Annicelli made his stage debut in 1927, cast by Dora Menichelli to play a fascinating officer in the drama play Guerra in tempo di pace. From then he started a career on stage with the major companies of the time, working with Lamberto Picasso, Emma Gramatica (with whom he made a long tour of South and Central America), Ruggero Ruggeri, Antonio Gandusio among others. In 1942 Annicelli become one of the most acclaimed radio actors reciting several Italian and especially Neapolitan comedies.
 
Annicelli was also active in films (even if usually in character roles), in television productions.

Filmography

References

External links 

 Massimo Colella, Profilo biografico di attori partenopei del XX secolo: VI. Corrado Annicelli, 2022 (https://www.centrostuditeatro.it/2022/03/corrado-annicelli/).

1905 births
1984 deaths
Italian male film actors
Italian male stage actors
Italian male television actors
Male actors from Naples
20th-century Italian male actors